Palasip Qaqqaa is a  mountain in the Qeqqata municipality in western Greenland. It is located on the mainland of Greenland on the coast of Davis Strait, immediately to the north of Sisimiut Airport.

The range flattens considerably towards the east in the area of Kangaamiut dike swarm north of Kangerlussuaq, due to pressure exerted by the icesheet for long periods in the past.

Topography 

The summits are separated by a depression of a very wide saddle. The massif is separated from the remainder of the ridge via several indistinctive saddles in the east.

The southern wall of Palasip Qaqqaa − the only wall of alpine character in the massif − is bisected by a chimney between the main summit and the slightly lower trabant to the west. It is the only part of the massif of interest to mountaineers.

Past the southern pillar falling directly from the summit, the wall gradually peters out into a progressively less steep rocky and grassy slope. The northern slope is not steep and is accessible via a range of routes.

Tourism 

The main summit is often visited for its long-range view of the coast, through a winding path from the south. The path crosses several barriers, from grassy at the bottom, to rocky at the top. The path disappears in the depression between the last barrier and the southern slope of the main ridge to the east of the southern pillar, to reappear as a lateral ledge in the slope below the eastern ridge.

The entire massif apart from the southern wall is easily accessible, while the southern pillar of the main summit and the small northern wall of the western summit offer many short routes for climbers.

Virtual Tour: You can take a virtual tour on the entire trail from start to the top, with full (360x360) panoramic images.

References 

Davis Strait
Mountains of Greenland
Sisimiut